Mystery hill is another name for a gravity hill, a type of optical illusion created by surrounding landscape. It may also refer to;
 Mystery Hill, a family entertainment complex in Blowing Rock, North Carolina
 Mystery Hill and Prehistoric Forest, an entertainment site, closed , in Marblehead, Ohio
 America's Stonehenge, an archaeological site in Salem, New Hampshire in the northeastern United States, known as Mystery Hill until 1982
 Mystery Hill, a tourist attraction outside Brooklyn, Michigan